Bloodline is a 2018 American psychological horror film directed by Henry Jacobson. The film was written by Avra Fox-Lerne, Will Honley and Jacobson. It stars Seann William Scott, Mariela Garriga, Dale Dickey, and Kevin Carroll. The film is a co-production between Divide/Conquer and Blumhouse Productions.

The film premiered at Fantastic Fest on September 22, 2018.

The film was released on September 20, 2019 by Momentum Pictures, and received mixed reviews from critics.

Plot 
A nurse finishing her shift goes to the staff changing room to take a shower and change. While in the shower an unseen person slashes her throat. The murderer washes their hands, leaves the hospital and appears to have buried the body. At home, Evan Cole returns to bed just as his baby son wakes up. He tells his wife to go back to sleep and that he will get up.

Evan (Seann William Scott) is a social worker who works with abused and troubled teens. Evan’s wife Lauren gives birth to a baby. Evan’s mother Marie visits the hospital as Lauren is having trouble breastfeeding her baby. The nurse is rude when Marie asks her to be more gentle with the baby. After a nightmare involving his father, Evan wakes up to find Marie has let herself in the house and is tending to the baby.

Evan has a session with one of his students, who was beaten by his father. Evan examines a police report on the boy's father and in the middle of the night, leaves his house. Stopping in front of a bar, the boy's father is thrown out, and Evan convinces the man to let him give him a ride home. At an abandoned mansion the man is squatting in, Evan knocks the man unconscious with a club and ties him to a chair. When the man awakes, he finds Evan dressed in a slicker and an audio recorder is set up. Evan asks the man to explain his feelings as he is beating his son. The man breaks down and explains he can't help himself when he is in a rage. Evan then kills the man.

Some time later, Evan is speaking with a female student who makes it apparent that her uncle has raped her. That night, Evan abducts the girl’s uncle and takes him to the abandoned mansion. In similar fashion, Evan requests that the man explain his feelings as he abuses his niece. Evan receives a call from his wife, who says that the baby has a fever of 105 degrees and she is at the hospital with Marie. Evan quickly kills the uncle, cleans up the scene, and goes to the hospital with his victim still in the trunk. While at the hospital Evan tells Lauren he was just out for a drive to clear his head. The doctor tells the family that the baby will be fine after being given Tylenol. The same nurse again makes a rude remark about Lauren being hysterical before leaving. Evan leaves later that night to bury the body in his trunk.

Evan gets a call from one of his students, Chris. Chris's drug-addicted father has returned home and hit Chris after an argument. Evan counsels Chris and the following night, Evan visits the hospital. The rude nurse tells a junkie looking for pain meds to leave and then ends her shift. The nurse is then murdered. At the same time, Evan is revealed to be in another area of the hospital, and offers the junkie some free drugs. It is revealed that the junkie is actually Chris's father, and the nurse was murdered by Marie, who removes the nurse’s body from the hospital on a gurney while disguised as a nurse.

Back at the abandoned mansion, Chris's father is being subjected to the same interrogation and torture as the others. He claims that he wants to be better and just had a relapse. Not believing him after the man reveals that Chris's mother just received a sizable inheritance, Evan kills him and buries his body on the mansion property, like the others. The following morning, it is revealed in a news broadcast that the bodies Evan buried were found. It is also revealed that as a child Evan's father returned after being driven away and attacked him and his mother. In order to protect his mother, Evan killed his father in the exact same way he does all his victims. Marie covered up the murder, buried his father in the garden, and promised to always protect him. As he interviews his students he finds that only the girl was happy that their abuser was dead. During a session with Chris, he mentions that Chris's father probably only came back for the money and he is better off without him. Chris is disturbed by this as he never told Evan about the inheritance and leaves the session early.

At Evan's home a Detective arrives. He interviews the family and reveals his suspicion that Evan is involved due to all the victims having a connection to Evan. The Detective leaves but returns later when Lauren is alone. The detective points out holes in their stories and Lauren begins to become suspicious of Evan. Sometime later, a news broadcast details the discovery of the nurse’s body as Evan and Marie exchange glances. That night Chris shows up at Evan's house to confront him with a gun about the killing of his father. Evan defuses the situation and sends the boy home without the gun. Marie has a conversation with Lauren, in which it is revealed Lauren has no family of her own besides Evan and the baby. Lauren, now almost convinced of Evan's involvement, searches his garage and finds some of the audio recordings Evan made while killing his victims. The next day Lauren asks Evan to watch the baby while she goes out. Lauren phones someone and tells them she would like to meet them. Marie points out to Evan that Lauren is behaving suspiciously, and Evan follows her. Lauren arrives at a remote location, and it is revealed that she is meeting with Chris. As she tells Chris she found proof that Evan killed his father, Lauren reveals that she is not upset about Evan committing the murder, but she is upset that he did it "for Chris". Lauren then forces the gun into Chris's hand and forces him to shoot himself in the head. All is witnessed by Evan who smiles as he realizes Lauren is willing to do anything to protect him, just like his mother. Lauren picks up Chris's phone and begins typing a message.

The detective shows up at the house to close the case as a social media post made from Chris's phone took credit for all the murders, saying he went after the abusers and then killed himself after killing his dad. Evan tells the detective he often let Chris be alone in his office and that is likely how he knew about the other abused kids. The detective leaves as the family stand looking at their sleeping child.

Cast 
 Seann William Scott as Evan Cole
 Hudson West as Young Evan
 Mariela Garriga as Lauren Cole, Evan's wife
 Dale Dickey as Marie Cole, Evan's mother
 Cassandra Ballard as Young Marie
 Kevin Carroll as Overstreet
 Matthew Bellows as Charles Henry Cole III

Production
Principal photography on the film began in January 2018.

Release
Bloodline had its world premiere at Fantastic Fest on September 22, 2018. The film was theatrically released on September 20, 2019 by Momentum Pictures.

Lakeshore Records released the Original Motion Picture Soundtrack of Bloodline, composed by Trevor Gureckis, on September 20, 2019.

Reception
On Metacritic, the film has a weighted average score of 50% based on reviews from 4 critics, indicating "mixed or average reviews".

Dennis Harvey of Variety magazine wrote: "Well acted (though Garriga doesn’t quite make a coherent character out of Lauren, or create believable marital chemistry with Scott), this is a smooth movie that maybe should have been a little less tidy for maximum impact."

References

External links 
 

2010s serial killer films
2018 films
2018 horror films
2010s slasher films
American psychological horror films
American serial killer films
American slasher films
Blumhouse Productions films
Films produced by Jason Blum
Films set in country houses
2010s English-language films
2010s American films